Camp Murphy may refer to:

 Camp Murphy (Florida), a former army camp in Florida
 The Melbourne Cricket Ground, occupied by the US military during World War II
 Murphys, California, a census-designated place
 The former name of Camp Aguinaldo, the headquarters of the Armed Forces of the Philippines